Gedangxiāng or Gutangxiāng is a township in Medog County, Nyingchi Prefecture in the Tibet region of China.

It is located near India. In 2007, there were 106 agricultural households with 588 people, mainly Tibetans.

References 

Populated places in Nyingchi